Marc Feldman or similar may refer to:

Marc Feldmann (born 1944), Oxford-based Australian immunologist
Marc Allan Feldman (1960–2016), American physician and politician
Marcus Feldman (born 1942), Australian-born mathematician turned US theoretical biologist
Mark Feldman (born 1955), American jazz violinist
Mark Feldman (drummer), American drummer